The Société Anonyme des Ateliers Edouard Mennig was a Belgic manufacturer of machine tools, especially for woodworking.

History 

Edouard Mennig founded his company in Avenue Van Volxem 310-312 in Brussels. His wood working machines were driven by a series of pulleys and belts and used for many operations from chopping to crafting.

References 

Woodworking
Machine tool builders
Defunct companies of Belgium